Kaysie Rogers-Lackey (born Brentwood, Tennessee, USA) is a food artist and cake decorating instructor based in Seattle, Washington. As owner of The People's Cake in Seattle, WA, she has been featured in wedding and cake magazines, including "Brides", Martha Stewart Weddings", Modern Wedding Cakes, Seattle Bride, "Seattle Metropolitan Bride and Groom" and American Cake Decorating. In 2015 Kaysie was also profiled in The Wall Street Journal's "What's In Her Bag?". She is a frequent competitor on Food Network Challenge cake decorating competitions, having been featured on four different episodes, and winning three as of 2012. She was also featured on Food Network's "Last Cake Standing". Kaysie teaches at cake decorating schools in the United Kingdom, United States, Mexico, Canada, Australia, Asia, Africa, South America, India, throughout Europe, and the Middle East. The People's Cake was named one of "Brides" magazine's Top 100 Cake Decorators in the United States in 2013. Kaysie was named one of "Martha Stewart Wedding's" Top 63 Pastry Professionals in 2014 and "Dessert Professionals" magazine's .

In 2014 Kaysie became a spokesperson for the cake decorating tool company Innovative Sugarworks .

References

 https://dessertprofessional.com/top-ten-chefs/top-10-cake-artists-of-2015

External links
The People's Cake
Innovative Sugarworks

American bakers
1981 births
Living people